Adrian Thompson may refer to:

Sportspeople
Adrian Thompson (boxer) (born 1964), British boxer
Adrian Thompson, head coach of Australia national under-20 rugby union team

Other uses
 Adrian Thompson (electronic designer); see Evolvable hardware
Adrian H. Thompson, History of the District of Columbia Fire and Emergency Medical Services Department#Thompson resignation
Adrian Thompson, musician in Northern Irish band Split Level
Adrian Thompson, political candidate in Tower Hamlets London Borough Council election, 1994

See also
Adrian Thomson, yacht designer of Team Philips